Adele of Vermandois (bef. 915–960) was both a Carolingian as well as a Robertian Frankish noblewoman who was the Countess of Flanders (934–960).

Life
Adele, born  was a daughter of Herbert II of Vermandois and his wife, Adele, daughter of Robert I of France. She died in 960 in Bruges.

In 934 Adele married Count Arnulf I of Flanders (c. 890 – 965). Together they had the following children:

 Hildegarde, born  934, died 990; she married Dirk II, Count of Holland.
 Liutgard, born in 935, died in 962; married Wichmann IV, Count of Hamaland.
 Egbert, died 953.
 Baldwin III of Flanders.  (c. 940 – 962). Married Mathilde Billung of Saxony (c. 940 – 1008), daughter of Hermann Billung, and had issue, Arnulf II, Count of Flanders (c. 960 – 987), who succeeded as count after Arnulf I, skipping one generation.
 Elftrude; married Siegfried, Count of Guînes.

Ancestry

See also

Counts of Flanders family tree

Notes

References

960 deaths
Countesses of Flanders
Herbertien dynasty
House of Flanders
10th-century French women
10th-century French people
Year of birth unknown
Year of birth uncertain